Christina Lund Madsen is a world champion Danish bridge player and journalist.

Lund Madsen has won four Danish Championships and was the editor of the Danish Bridge Magazine for 6 years.

On June 11, 2015 Lund Madsen won a talent award/scholarship from HRH Prince Henrik of Denmark as a bridge player and role model/communicator of 
bridge.

Bridge accomplishments

Wins
 Nordic Womens Teams Championships 2013
 Nordic Womens Teams Championships 2015
 European Mixed Championships in Tromsø, Norway, 2015
 European Mixed Championships in Istanbul 2019
 North American Bridge Championships (1)
 Jacoby Open Swiss Teams (1) 2014 
 World Mixed Championships in Wroclaw, Poland 2022

Runners-up

 Bronze winner 15th World Bridge Series Mixed Teams 2018

Notes

External links

Danish contract bridge players
Living people
Year of birth missing (living people)